The Betty Berzon Emerging Writer Award is an annual literary award, presented by Publishing Triangle to honor achievement by an emerging LGBTQ writer. The prize is presented to a writer who has shown exceptional talent and the promise of continued literary success and significance in the future.

From 2013 to 2016, the award was presented by Lambda Literary Foundation as a Lambda Literary Award, until taken over by Publishing Triangle. First presented by Publishing Triangle in 2017, the award was named in memory of American author and psychotherapist Betty Berzon, who won the fight to have the American Psychiatric Association declassify homosexuality as a mental illness, and contributed to LGBTQ advocacy throughout her lifetime. The award is sponsored by Berzon's widow, Teresa DeCrescenzo.

Recipients

References

External links

See also 

 Judith A. Markowitz Award for Exceptional New LGBTQ Writers

Triangle Awards
LGBT literary awards
LGBT literature in the United States
Awards established in 2013